Players is an American mockumentary television series created by Dan Perrault and Tony Yacenda, that premiered on June 16, 2022, on Paramount+. The series is a parody of sports documentaries, and follows Fugitive Gaming, a fictional pro League of Legends esports team.

Cast and characters

Main 

 Misha Brooks as Creamcheese, Fugitive's 27-year-old veteran player
 Da’Jour Jones as Organizm, Fugitive's 17-year old gaming prodigy
 Ely Henry as Kyle Braxton, Fugitive's coach, and Creamcheese's closest friend

Recurring

 Holly Chou as April Braxton
 Youngbin Chung as Nightfall
 Noh Dong-Hyeon as BAP
 Michael Ahn as Bucket
 Moses Storm as Guru
 Alexa Mansour as Emma 'Emmanence' Resnick
 Luke Tennie as Rudy Elmore Jr.
 Matt Shively as Frugger
 Stephen Schneider as Nathan Resnick
 Peter Thurnwald as Foresight
 Miles Mussenden as Rudy Elmore Sr.
 Arischa Conner as Simone Elmore
 Dan Perrault as Paul 'Bignpaul' Gilberstadt
 Ryan O'Flanagan as Chris McManus
 Christopher Gilstrap as PuttPutt

Episodes

Production 
In August 2021, it was announced that Paramount+ had picked up a new comedic docu-style series that will explore the world of esports, titled Players. The show is created by American Vandal co-creators, Tony Yacenda and  Dan Perrault, both of whom serve as executive producers, with the former directing. CBS Studios produces the series, in association with, Funny or Die, Riot Games, 3 Arts Entertainment and Brillstein Entertainment Partners.

After coming off from American Vandal, Yacenda and Perrault sought to do another mockumentary style show. They got the idea for Players after doing research on the world of esports. Sport docuseries like The Last Dance, Cheer and  Formula 1: Drive to Survive were inspirations for the show. The creators also looked at the narrative drama The Queen's Gambit as an example of how to depict a complicated game like chess for viewers who may not know the rules. In addition to having people from the League community in the writers room, producers at Riot Games would fact-check the scripts, in order to keep the show authentic to real life esports.

On February 1, 2023, the series was removed from Paramount+.

Release 
The first four episodes were released on June 16, 2022, with subsequent episodes releasing weekly until July 28, 2022. The first season consisted of ten episodes.

In December of 2022, Funny or Die released the entire first season for free on their YouTube channel.

Reception 
 On Metacritic, the series has a weighted average score of 80 out of 100, based on reviews from 10 critics, indicating "generally favorable reviews".

References

External links 
 
 

2020s American comedy-drama television series
2020s American mockumentary television series
2020s American parody television series
2022 American television series debuts
2022 American television series endings
English-language television shows
Esports television series
Paramount+ original programming
Riot Games
Television series by 3 Arts Entertainment
Television series by CBS Studios
Television series by Funny or Die